Pirate Party is a label adopted by political parties around the world. Pirate parties support civil rights, direct democracy (including e-democracy) or alternatively participation in government, reform of copyright and patent law, free sharing of knowledge (open content), information privacy, transparency, freedom of information, free speech, anti-corruption and net neutrality. The name pirate party alludes to online piracy; pirate parties do not represent oceangoing pirates.

Pirate parties are often considered outside of the economic left-right spectrum or to have context-dependent appeal.

History
The first Pirate Party to be established was the Pirate Party of Sweden, whose website was launched on 1 January 2006 by Rick Falkvinge. Falkvinge was inspired to found the party after he found that Swedish politicians were generally unresponsive to Sweden's debate over changes to copyright law in 2005.

The United States Pirate Party was founded on 6 June 2006 by University of Georgia graduate student Brent Allison. The party's concerns were abolishing the Digital Millennium Copyright Act, reducing the length of copyrights from 95 years after publication or 70 years after the author's death to 14 years, and the expiry of patents that do not result in significant progress after four years, as opposed to 20 years. However, Allison stepped down as leader three days after founding the party.

The Pirate Party of Austria was founded in July 2006 in the run-up to the 2006 Austrian legislative election by Florian Hufsky and Jürgen "Juxi" Leitner.

The Pirate Party of Finland was founded in 2008 and entered the official registry of Finnish political parties in 2009.

The Pirate Party of the Czech Republic was founded on 19 April 2009 by Jiří Kadeřávek.

The 2009 European Parliament election took place between the 4 and 7 June 2009, and various Pirate Parties stood candidates. The most success was had in Sweden, where the Pirate Party of Sweden won 7.1% of the vote, and had Christian Engström elected as the first ever Pirate Party Member of European Parliament (MEP). Following the introduction of the Treaty of Lisbon, the Pirate Party of Sweden were afforded another MEP in 2011, that being Amelia Andersdotter.

On 30 July 2009, the Pirate Party UK was registered with the Electoral Commission. Its first party leader was Andrew Robinson, and its treasurer was Eric Priezkalns.

In April 2010, an international organisation to encourage cooperation and unity between Pirate Parties, Pirate Parties International, was founded in Belgium.

In the 2011 Berlin state election to the Abgeordnetenhaus of Berlin, the Pirate Party of Berlin (a state chapter of Pirate Party Germany) won 8.9% of the vote, which corresponded to winning 15 seats. John Naughton, writing for The Guardian, argued that the Pirate Party of Berlin's success could not be replicated by the Pirate Party UK, as the UK does not use a proportional representation electoral system.

In the 2013 Icelandic parliamentary election, the Icelandic Pirate Party won 5.1% of the vote, returning three Pirate Party Members of Parliament. Those were Birgitta Jónsdóttir for the Southwest Constituency, Helgi Hrafn Gunnarsson for Reykjavik Constituency North and Jón Þór Ólafsson for Reykjavik Constituency South. Birgitta had previously been an MP for the Citizens' Movement (from 2009 to 2013), representing Reykjavik Constituency South. , it was the largest political party in Iceland, with 23.9% of the vote.

The 2014 European Parliament election took place between the 22 and 24 May. Felix Reda was at the top of the list for Pirate Party Germany, and was subsequently elected as the party received 1.5% of the vote. Other notable results include the Czech Pirate Party, who received 4.8% of the vote, meaning they were 0.2% off getting elected, the Pirate Party of Luxembourg, who received 4.2% of the vote, and the Pirate Party of Sweden, who received 2.2% of the vote, but lost both their MEPs.

Reda had previously worked as an assistant in the office of former Pirate Party MEP Amelia Andersdotter. On 11 June 2014, Reda was elected vice-president of the Greens/EFA group in the European Parliament. Reda was given the job of copyright reform rapporteur.

The Icelandic Pirate Party was leading the national polls in March 2015, with 23.9%. The Independence Party polled 23.4%, only 0.5% behind the Pirate Party. According to the poll, the Pirate Party would win 16 seats in the Althing. In April 2016, in the wake of the Panama Papers scandal, polls showed the Icelandic Pirate Party at 43% and the Independence Party at 21.6%, although the Pirate Party eventually won 15% of the vote and 10 seats in the 29 October 2016 parliamentary election.

In April 2017, a group of students at University of California, Berkeley formed a Pirate Party to participate in the Associated Students of the University of California senate elections, winning the only third-party seat.

Czech Pirate Party entered the Chamber of Deputies of the Czech Parliament for the first time after the election held on 20 and 21 October 2017 with 10.8%.

Czech Pirate Party, after finishing at the second place at the 2018 Prague municipal election, held on 5 and 6 October 2018, with 17.1%, formed a coalition with Prague Together and United Forces for Prague (TOP 09, Mayors and Independents, KDU-ČSL, Liberal-Environmental Party and SNK European Democrats). The representative of the Czech Pirate Party, Zdeněk Hřib, was selected as a Mayor of Prague. It is probably for the first time, when any pirate party has a mayor in one of the major cities of the world.

At the 2019 European Parliament election, three Czech Pirate MEPs and one German Pirate MEP were voted in and joined the Greens–European Free Alliance, the aforementioned group in the European Parliament that has previously included Swedish Pirate MEPs and German Julia Reda.

Common policies

While parties vary insofar as specific policies go, common themes of the Pirate movement include:

 Defend the freedom of expression, communication, education; respect the privacy of citizens and civil rights in general.
 Defend the free flow of ideas, knowledge and culture.
 Support politically the reform of copyright and patent laws. 
 Have a commitment to work collaboratively, and participate with maximum transparency.
 Do not support actions that involve violence.
 Use free software and open source software, open-source hardware, DIY and open protocols whenever possible.
 Politically defend an open, participative and collaborative construction of any public policy.
 Direct democracy/E-democracy
 Open access
 Open data
 Crowdfunding and crowdsourcing

Copyright and censorship
Some campaigns have included demands for the reform of copyright and patent laws. In 2010, Swedish MEP Christian Engström called for supporters of amendments to the Data Retention Directive to withdraw their signatures, citing a misleading campaign.

International organizations

Pirate Parties International

Pirate Parties International (PPI) is the umbrella organization of the national Pirate Parties. Since 2006, the organization has existed as a loose union of the national parties. Since October 2009, Pirate Parties International has had the status of a non-governmental organization (Feitelijke vereniging) based in Belgium. The organization was officially founded at a conference from 16 to 18 April 2010 in Brussels, when the organization's statutes were adopted by the 22 national pirate parties represented at the event.

European Pirate Party

The European Pirate Party (PPEU) is a European political party founded in March 2014 which consists of various pirate parties within European countries.

Pirates without Borders
Pirates Without Borders is an international association of pirates. Unlike Pirate Parties International (which accepts only parties as voting members and organizations as observing members), Pirates Without Borders accept individuals as members. The PWB see themselves as a basis for international projects. Through global cooperation, they strive to reveal the impact of multinational trade agreements on all people on Earth, and foster freedom and democracy. PWB originates from an independent committee for the coordination of Pirate parties in German-speaking countries, known as DACHLuke (DACHL = Germany-Austria-Switzerland-Luxembourg).

Since the Pirate Parties International Conference 2011 on 12 and 13 March 2011, PWB is an "observing member" of Pirate Parties International. The previously independent project "pirate streaming" has become a part of Pirates without Borders since 3 May 2011.

Parti Pirate Francophone
In Parti Pirate Francophone, the French-speaking Pirate Parties are organized. Current members are the pirates parties in Belgium, Côte d'Ivoire, France, Canada, and Switzerland.

European Parliament elections

2009

2013

*Held in 2013 due to Croatia's entry into EU

2014

1Party only participated in North West England constituency
2PPAT is in alliance with two other parties: The Austrian Communist Party and Der Wandel. The alliance is called "Europa Anders" and also includes some independents in their lists
3with Ecological Greens
4PPEE are campaigning for an independent candidate (Silver Meikar) who supports the pirate program

2019

National elections

Elected representatives

Representatives of the Pirate Party movement that have been elected to a national or supranational legislature.

Pirate Party of Sweden
 Christian Engström, MEP for Sweden from 2009 to 2014
 Amelia Andersdotter, MEP for Sweden from 2011 to 2014

Czech Pirate Party

Chamber of Deputies of the Czech Republic
Since the 2021 Czech legislative election, only the following 4 MP are in office:
 Jakub Michálek, MP for Prague since 2017
 Olga Richterová, MP for Prague since 2017
 Ivan Bartoš, MP for Central Bohemia from 2017 to 2021, MP for Ústí nad Labem since 2021, Leader of the Czech Pirate Party and Minister of Regional Development since 2021
 Klára Kocmanová, MP for Central Bohemia since 2021
The following served as MPs from 2017 to 2021
 Dana Balcarová, MP for Prague
 Ondřej Profant, MP for Prague
 Jan Lipavský, MP for Prague
 Lenka Kozlová, MP for Central Bohemia
 František Kopřiva, MP for Central Bohemia
 Lukáš Kolařík, MP for South Bohemia
 Lukáš Bartoň, MP for Plzeň
 Petr Třešnák, MP for Karlovy Vary
 František Navrkal, MP for Ústí nad Labem from 2019
 Tomáš Martínek, MP for Liberec 
 Martin Jiránek, MP for Hradec Králové 
 Mikuláš Ferjenčík, MP for Pardubice
 Jan Pošvář, MP for Vysočina
 Radek Holomčík, MP for South Moravia
 Tomáš Vymazal, MP for South Moravia
 Vojtěch Pikal, MP for Olomouc
 František Elfmark, MP for Zlín
 Lukáš Černohorský, MP for Moravian-Silesian
 Ondřej Polanský, MP for Moravian-Silesian
 Mikuláš Peksa, MP for Ústí nad Labem from 2017 to 2019, then elected to European Parlament

Senate of the Czech Republic (in office)
 Lukáš Wagenknecht, Senator for Prague 8 since 2018
 Adéla Šípová, Senator for Kladno since 2020

European Parliament
 Marcel Kolaja, MEP for Czech Republic since 2019
 Markéta Gregorová, MEP for Czech Republic since 2019
 Mikuláš Peksa, MEP for Czech Republic since 2019

Former representatives
 Libor Michálek, Senator for Prague 2 from 2012 to 2018
 Mikuláš Peksa, MP for Ústí nad Labem from 2017 to 2019

Pirate Party Germany
 Patrick Breyer, MEP for Germany since 2019

Former representatives
 Felix Reda, MEP for Germany from 2014 to 2019

Pirate Party Iceland
 Andrés Ingi Jónsson, MP for Reykjavík North from 2016, originally as a member of the Left-Green Movement, member of the Pirate Party since 2021
 Arndís Anna Kristínardóttir Gunnarsdóttir, MP for Reykjavík South since 2021
 Björn Leví Gunnarsson, MP for Reykjavík North from 2016 to 2017 and for Reykjavík South since 2017
 Gísli Rafn Ólafsson,  MP for Southwest since 2021
 Halldóra Mogensen, MP for Reykjavík North since 2016
 Þórhildur Sunna Ævarsdóttir, MP for Southwest from 2016 to 2017, for Reykjavík South from 2017 to 2021, and for Southwest from 2021

Former representatives (Iceland)
 Birgitta Jónsdóttir, MP for Reykjavík South from 2009 to 2013, and for Southwest from 2013 to 2017
 Ásta Guðrún Helgadóttir, MP for Reykjavík South from 2015 to 2017
 Einar Brynjólfsson, MP for Northeast from 2016 to 2017
 Eva Pandóra Baldursdóttir, MP for Northwest from 2016 to 2017
 Gunnar Hrafn Jónsson, MP for Reykjavík South from 2016 to 2017
 Helgi Hrafn Gunnarsson, MP for Reykjavík North from 2013 to 2016 and again from 2017 to 2021
 Jón Þór Ólafsson, MP for Reykjavík South from 2013 to 2015 and for Southwest from 2016 to 2021
 Smári McCarthy, MP for Southwest since 2016 to 2021

Pirate Party Luxembourg
 Sven Clement, MP for Centre
 Marc Goergen, MP for Sud

National parties

Outside Sweden, pirate parties have been started in over 40 countries, inspired by the Swedish initiative.

See also

 Copyleft
 Criticism of copyright
 Internet freedom
 Piratbyrån
 Right to privacy
 Steal This Film
 The Pirate Bay

References

External links

 Pirate Parties International – official website

 
Anti-corruption parties
Civil liberties advocacy groups
Civil rights organizations
Computer law organizations
Copyright law
Digital rights
Direct democracy movement
Free and open-source software organizations
Freedom of expression organizations
Freedom of information
Freedom of speech
Intellectual property activism
Internet privacy organizations
Internet-related activism
Net neutrality
Open government
Participatory democracy
Patent reform
Political parties established in 2006
Politics and technology
Privacy organizations
Transnational political parties